The Deadly Isles is a novel by American author Jack Vance published in 1969 by Bobbs-Merrill and as part of the 2002 Vance Integral Edition.

Plot introduction
A young scientist with family ties to a vast fortune survives a murder attempt by a stranger while working in French Tahiti, and allows the assailant and the police to believe the attempt was successful. Incognito, he follows the would-be murderer aboard an island-hopping passenger/cargo schooner bound for the Marquesas, intending to find the man out.

1969 American novels
1969 science fiction novels
Novels by Jack Vance
Novels set in Oceania
Novels set in Tahiti
Bobbs-Merrill Company books